Hannah Stocking-Siagkris (born February 4, 1992) is an American internet personality who first gained recognition from the social media platform Vine. She later became known for her comedy videos on YouTube. 

Stocking has over 8 million subscribers on YouTube, 23 million followers on Instagram, and 26.7 million followers on TikTok. She is the host of Mindie, a YouTube Music talk show produced by Shots Studios.

Life and career
Hannah Stocking was born on February 4, 1992, in Ashland, Oregon, the daughter of Holly and Jon Stocking. She has a sister, Ruby. She is of Greek, Armenian, Ukrainian, and Hungarian descent. She attended Ashland High School in Ashland, Oregon, where she was a three-year varsity volleyball player. Afterward, Stocking moved back to California to attend Dominican University of California in San Rafael, where she studied biology and chemistry and continued playing volleyball.

She appeared in G-eazy's music video "Tumblr Girls" in 2014 and starred in Blink-182's "She's Out of Her Mind" video in 2016 with Lele Pons and Vale Genta. She also played the role of Anna in Tyler Perry's horror-comedy sequel Boo 2! A Madea Halloween.

Stocking partnered in February 2018 with ATTN, a media company focused on creating content surrounding important societal topics, to create science-based videos for her YouTube channel. In April 2018, she created and starred in the official lyric video for Poo Bear, Justin Bieber, and Jay Electronica's single "Hard 2 Face Reality", which also featured Lele Pons. In June 2018, she launched the educational series The Science of Beauty on Instagram's IGTV platform.

In 2019, Stocking was the first creator to receive the Women's Entrepreneurship Day Pioneer Award at the United Nations.

Filmography
 Boo 2! A Madea Halloween as Anna
 Undivided ATTN: as Host
 Satanic Panic as Kristen Larson
 Vanquish as Galyna
 iCarly (2021) as Sunny Johnson

See also
 Anwar Jibawi

References

External links
 

1992 births
Living people
People from Los Angeles
Dominican University of California alumni
Vine (service) celebrities
People from Ashland, Oregon
American people of Greek descent
American people of Ukrainian descent
American YouTubers
American people of Armenian descent
American people of Hungarian descent